McLean High School or McLean School is a public high school located in the city of McLean, Texas USA and classified as a 1A school by the UIL. It is a part of the McLean Independent School District located in central Gray County. In 2013, the school was rated "Met Standard" by the Texas Education Agency.

Athletics
The McLean Tigers compete in these sports 

Basketball
Cross Country
6-Man Football
Golf
Softball
Tennis
Track and Field

State titles
Boys Track
1968
Football
2018(1A/D1) Six Man

State finalist
2019(1A/D1) Six Man

Theater
One Act Play 
1959(1A)

References

External links
McLean ISD website

Public high schools in Texas
Schools in Gray County, Texas